The Art Garfunkel Album (re-titled My Best in Germany) is the first compilation album by Art Garfunkel, released in 1984. It contained thirteen of his greatest hits from the first eleven years of his solo career as well as new single, "Sometimes When I'm Dreaming".

Track listing 
 "Bright Eyes" (Mike Batt) - 3:56
 "Break Away" (Benny Gallagher, Graham Lyle) - 3:35
 "A Heart in New York" (Benny Gallagher, Graham Lyle) - 3:11
 "I Shall Sing" (Van Morrison) - 3:31
 "99 Miles From L.A." (Albert Hammond, Hal David) - 3:30
 "All I Know" (Jimmy Webb) - 3:43
 "(What a) Wonderful World" (Herb Alpert, Sam Cooke, Lou Adler) - 3:29
 "I Only Have Eyes for You" (Al Dubin, Harry Warren) – 3:38
 "Watermark" (Jimmy Webb) - 2:59
 "I Believe (When I Fall in Love It Will Be Forever)" (Stevie Wonder, Yvonne Wright) – 3:48
 "Scissors Cut" (Jimmy Webb) - 3:52
 "Sometimes When I'm Dreaming" (Mike Batt) 3:35
 "Traveling Boy" (Paul Williams, Roger Nichols) – 3:42
 "The Same Old Tears On a New Background" (Stephen Bishop) – 3:45

Charts

Weekly charts

Year-end charts

Certifications

References

Art Garfunkel albums
1984 greatest hits albums
Columbia Records compilation albums